The 1944 Arkansas Razorbacks football team represented the University of Arkansas in the Southwest Conference (SWC) during the 1944 college football season. In their first year under head coach Glen Rose, the Razorbacks compiled a 5–5–1 record (2–2–1 against SWC opponents), finished in third place in the SWC, and were outscored by their opponents by a combined total of 161 to 120.

Schedule

References

Arkansas
Arkansas Razorbacks football seasons
Arkansas Razorbacks football